The IMOCA 60 Class yacht Spirit Of Hungary, HUN 77 was designed by Nandor Fa and Attila Dery-Hu for him to compete in the Barcelona World Race and Vendee Globe and launched in the 7 April 2014 after being built Pauger Composite based in Kápolnásnyék in Hungary.

Racing Results

Timeline

2014 - 2017 Spirit of Hungary

2018 - Unnamed
Denis Van Weynbergh

2019 - Eyesea.BE, BEL 207

2021 - Les Laboratoires de Biarritz - No Limit 4 Us, BEL 207

References 

Individual sailing yachts
2010s sailing yachts
Sailboat types built in Hungary
Vendée Globe boats
IMOCA 60